Khin Myo Chit is a Burmese politician who currently serves as a Sagaing Region Hluttaw member of parliament for Kanbalu Township No. 1 Constituency.

She is a member of the National League for Democracy.

Political career
In the Myanmar general election, 2015, she was elected as a Sagaing Region Hluttaw MP, winning a majority of 36,864 votes and elected representative from Kanbalu Township No. 1 parliamentary constituency.

She is currently serves as secretary in Government guarantees, admission and commitment appraisal committee in the Sagaing Region Hluttaw.

References

National League for Democracy politicians
Members of legislatures of Burmese states and regions
People from Sagaing Region
Living people
Year of birth missing (living people)